Upcott is an historic manor in the parish of Cheriton Fitzpaine, Devon. The manor house, known as Upcott Barton is a mediaeval grade II* listed building notorious in the history of Devon as the place where in 1455 the murder of the lawyer Nicholas Radford by a mob directed by the Earl of Devon during the Wars of the Roses took place. In the grounds is a reproduction of an Iron Age roundhouse built circa 2014.

Descent

Robert, Count of Mortain
Upcott is not listed as a manor in the Domesday Book of 1086, but is believed to have formed part of one of the two manors called Stochelie listed consecutively amongst the 79 Devonshire holdings of Robert, Count of Mortain (d.1091), uterine half-brother of William the Conqueror and the tenant-in-chief with the largest landholdings in England. Both were sub-infeudated to Alured Pincerna ("Alfred the Butler" or "Alfred the Cup-Bearer"), feudal baron of Chiselborough in Somerset, whose main landholdings were in Cornwall and Somerset, a follower of the Count, and also held in Devon from the same overlord the manors of Pocheelle (Poughill, adjacent to today's Cheriton Fitzpaine) and also Little Torrington. However, before the Norman Conquest of 1066 one of the two manors called Stocheliehad been held by a Saxon named Ordgar, "Edmer Ator's man", with land for 10 ploughs, the other by Hademar, with land for 7 ploughs. The correct identification to modern places of the numerous Domesday Book  manors in Devon called Stochelie, Estocheleia, Estochelia,, etc., has presented modern scholars with difficulties. However, in the opinion of the authoritative Devon historian Hoskins (1966) Upcott was situated in that Stochelie held by Alured in 1086 and held before the Norman Conquest by the Saxon Ordgar, which manor "may be identified beyond doubt as South Stockleigh alias Sutton Satchvill in Cheriton Fitzpaine".

Robert, Count of Mortain, rebelled against King William Rufus, the younger son of William the Conqueror and successor to the English throne, and his lands escheated to the crown. These lands subsequently were split off to form several separate feudal baronies.

Pincerna
Following the rebellion of Robert, Count of Mortain, Alfred Pincerna and his descendants retained possession of Stockleigh and its sub-member. The "surname" of the family appears not to have become fixed, but will be represented here by the Domesday Book epithet "Pincerna". The descent was as follows:
Alfred Pincerna. He was still alive in 1103/6 when he witnessed a deed.
William Pincerna ( 1157-8, possibly named as was then usual "William FitzAlfred", son and successor. 
Richard Pincerna (died post 1185), son and heir.
John Pincerna (c.1173-1228), son and heir, who died without male progeny, having left his daughter Katherine Pincerna as his sole heiress, who died without progeny, having married Michael FitzRalph (d.1242).

Brewer
In 1200 the Pincerna family surrendered Upcott to the great magnate William Brewer (died 1226).

Mohun
Upcott then descended to the de Mohun family, feudal barons of Dunster, seated at Dunster Castle in Somerset.

Courtenay of Tiverton

In 1365 Sir John V de Mohun, 2nd Baron Mohun, KG, (c.1320–1375) granted Upcott to Hugh de Courtenay, 2nd Earl of Devon (1303-1377), of Tiverton Castle and Okehampton Castle, and  his wife Margaret de Bohun (1311-1391). It thus became one of the several dozen if not over one hundred, manors held by the Earls, and descended as the Earldom of Devon. The Courtenays subinfeudated Upcott with their own followers and tenants. In the 15th century one of these was the prominent lawyer Nicholas Radford (d.1455). The Courtenay Earls of Devon were extinguished in the wars of the Roses, and their lands escheated to the crown. Thus the Courtenay overlordship ended.

Radford

In the 15th century the prominent lawyer Nicholas Radford (d.1455) was the tenant of Upcott under the Courtenay earls of Devon. In the feudal era a tenant was obliged by the terms of his tenure to remain loyal to his overlord. Radford however found himself in the situation of acting as lawyer to William Bonville, 1st Baron Bonville, of Shute, the chief enemy of his overlord Thomas de Courtenay, 5th Earl of Devon, by whose orders he was murdered at home at Upcott, which crime was one of the most notorious in 15th century England and in the entire history of Devon. Following the murder the Bonville–Courtenay feud was finally ended at the Battle of Clyst Heath (1455) at which Bonville was defeated by Courtenay's private army.

Prouse

His heirs to Poughill and also to Upcott were Roger Prouz (alias Prouse) of Prouz, Devon, and also his relative John Radford. According to Pole his sister Thomasine Radford (called Jone by Risdon) had married Roger Prouse, by whom she had a son Nicholas Prouse of Prouse. The inheritance of Upcott was contested between John Radford and the Prouse family, and according to Pole the Prouses eventually released their right to John Radford. However, by a marriage settlement dated 1509, Mary Prowse brought to her husband, John Gye, lands called "Upcott" in Cheriton Fitzpaine near Poughill. In 1516 she and her husband claimed the lands of Thomas Prowse (apparently her father) in Poughill, Dodderidge, Elsington and elsewhere. The Courtenay Earls of Devon were extinguished in the wars of the Roses, and their lands escheated to the crown. Thus the Courtenay overlordship ended.

Courtenay of Powderham

James I Courtenay
During the reign of King Henry VIII (1509-1547) Upcott was  the seat of James I Courtenay, a younger son of Sir William II Courtenay (1451–1512) of Powderham, and brother of Sir William III Courtenay (1477–1535) "The Great", which family during the Wars of the Roses and at the  Battle of Clyst Heath (1455) were members of the Bonville faction and were thus enemies of their distant cousins the Courtenay Earls of Devon of Tiverton Castle. James I Courtenay married Anne Basset, a daughter of Sir John Basset (1462–1528), KB, of Tehidy in Cornwall and  Umberleigh in Devon,  Sheriff of Cornwall in 1497, 1517 and 1522 and Sheriff of Devon in 1524, by his first wife Elizabeth (or Ann) Denys, daughter of John Denys of Orleigh, near Bideford, by his wife Eleanor Giffard (daughter and co-heiress of Stephen Giffard of Thuborough). Anne Basset as a child had been sent by her father, together with her sister Thomasine, to live in the household of Giles Daubeney, 1st Baron Daubeney (1451–1508), under a special agreement entered into in 1504, referred to by the family as the "Great Indenture". This specified that Daubeney would pay about £2,000 for the recoveries of Basset's Beaumont inheritance on condition that one of the Basset daughters and co-heiresses would marry Daubeney's son Henry Daubeney (1493–1548), on whom the lands were entailed. The marriage never took place and in 1511 she married James Courtenay (born 1459) of Upcott, a younger son  of Sir William I Courtenay (d.1485) of Powderham by his wife Margaret Bonville a  daughter of William Bonville, 1st Baron Bonville (d. 1461).

Two stone sculpted angels holding heraldic escutcheons survive above the capitals of the arcade separating the Upcott Chapel from the chancel of St Matthew's Church. One shows Courtenay (Or, three torteaux) impaling: a lion rampant coward (with tail between its legs) and the other Courtenay (Or, three torteaux) impaling per fess in chief: A lion passant coward (with tail between its legs) and in base: three birds.

James II Courtenay

James II Courtenay (d.1592), "The Younger", son of James I inherited Upcott from his father. He married twice:
Firstly to Jane Prideaux, daughter of John Prideaux (1520-1558) of Nutwell in the parish of Woodbury, serjeant-at-law, MP for Devon inn 1553. Nutwell manor house is situated on the east bank of the estuary of the River Exe almost directly across the water from the Courtenay seat Powderham Castle. 
Secondly he married Christiana Rolle, widow of Richard Wykes of Mynde Florye in Somerset and a daughter of George Rolle (c.1486–1552) of Stevenstone, near Great Torrington in Devon, the founder of the wealthy, influential and widespread Rolle family of Devon. He was named as an overseer of the will dated 1570 of his brother-in-law John Rolle (1522–1570) of Stevenstone.

The ledger stone (across the middle of which now stands the 1926 wooden chancel screen) of James Courtenay (d.1592) "The Younger" survives in the Upcott Chapel, St Matthew's Church, the most ancient stone in the church, inscribed in Gothic script as follows:
"Here lieth James Courteny The Younger Estquier who deceased the viii day of September A(nn)o D(o)m. 1592".

Moore

John I Moore (1582-1641)

John I Moore (1582-1641) of Moore "near Tavistock", in Devon (possibly More-Malherbe in the parish of Broadwoodwidger, 10 miles north-west of Tavistock, where many of the Moore family were buried), married Gertrude Courtenay (1592-1666), daughter and heiress of the last James Courtenay of Upcott. Gertrude Courtenay was buried in the Upcott Chapel forming the east end of the north aisle of St Matthew's Church, Cheriton Fitzpaine, where her ledger stone survives, today on the floor of the vestry which together with the organ has occupied part of the former chapel. It displays the canting arms of Moore (Argent, a chevron between three moorcocks sable) quartering Courtenay, and is inscribed as follows:
"The remaines of Garthrude daughter of James Courtenay of Upcot Esqr wife to John Moore of Moore Esqr and mother to John Moore of Upcot Esqr. Deceased the 12th of March Anno Dom 1666 aetatis suae 74".

John II Moore (1636-1700)

John II Moore (1636-1700), son and heir, who laid down two similar ledger stones in St Matthew's Church, Cheriton Fitzpaine, one to his mother Gertrude Courtenay (1592-1666) and another to his first wife who died 5 years later in 1671. He married twice:
Firstly to Catherine Courtenay (1632-1671), a daughter of John Courtenay (d.1661) of Molland in North Devon, descended from Sir Philip Courtenay (died 1488) of Molland, the second son of Sir Philip Courtenay (1404-1463) of Powderham by his wife Elizabeth Hungerford. Her ledger stone survives in St Matthew's Church, Cheriton Fitzpaine, in the south aisle, in an identical style to that of her mother-in-law. It displays the arms of Moore impaling Courtenay of Molland (Or, three torteaux a label of three points azure each point charged with three plates) and is inscribed as follows:
"The remains of Catherine daughter to John Courtenay of Molland Esqr and wife to John Moore of Upcot Esqr who religiously quitted this life July 5th Anno Dom 1671 and of her age the 39(th)".
Secondly he married a certain Sara (d.1691), whose paternal arms were: Argent, on a bend sable three eaglets displayed of the first, whose grand mural monument survives in the Upcott Chapel in St Matthew's Church, but does not mention her father's name. On the same monument on a small panel at the base is inscribed a memorial to her husband John II Moore (1636-1700).

Monument to 2nd wife

The mural monument survives in the Upcott Chapel in St Matthew's Church, of Sara Moore (d.1691) inscribed on an oval panel as follows:
Subtus reponuntur mortalitans pulvera(?) Sarae uxoris Johannis Moore de Upcot Armigeri, qua vivente "ευρηκα suum ευρηκα"(?) merito ingeminaverit foelicissimus conjux, qua moriente ille (hoc saltem nomine) foelix esse desiit, illa incepit quippe postquam amantissimam sponsam sponsam obsequentissimam tenerrimam(que) matrem familias cordatissimam lectissimam utrobi(que) faeminam se terris indicasset ex amplexibus sancti amoris maestissimi conjugis rapta fuit ut in sanctiorem Do(min)i sui charissimi Jesu Christi sinum deponeretur Nov(embris) 5o (quinto) aerae Christianiae an(n)o 1691. ("Underneath lie the mortal dust of Sara, wife of John Moore of Upcott, Esquier, who with her living, his Eureka! Eureka!, deservedly became double the happiest husband, with her dying, he (at least in that name) ceased to be happy, she certainly began afterwards the most loving wife the most obedient and tender wife, a  mother most prudent, a woman most excellent on both sides... from the embraces of sacred love of her most grieving husband she was seized away so that she might be deposited in the more sacred bosom of her dearest Lord Jesus Christ, on the 5th of November in the year 1691 of the Christian era").

Underneath on a rectangular tablet is inscribed:
Hic juxta reponuntur exuviae Johannis Moore arm(iger)i ju(nior)i(?) postq(ua)m candore niveo probitate eximia ανεξικακια plane heroica generosum stemma adornasset; fato concessit & cum lectissimae conjugis cineribus suos sociavit Ap(rilis) 20o (vicensimo) 1700. ("Near here lie the mortal off-casts of John Moore, Esquire, junior, ... with snowy brightness, with exceptional probity, forbearing, he thoroughly adorned his heroic and noble family tree. He conceded to Fate and allied his own with the ashes of his most excellent wife on 20th of April 1700").

Basset

Upcott later passed to the Basset family of Umberleigh, North Devon.

Fursdon
In about 1790 Upcott was purchased from the Basset family by the Fursdon family of Fursdon, in the parish of Cadbury, which latter manor they had held since the reign of King Henry III (1216-1272). The Courtenay family of Powderham were lords of the manor of Cadbury in the 17th century, until some time before 1810, when the Fursdon family acquired that lordship. The Fursdon family retained Upcott until about the 1930s.

References

Sources
Thorp, R.L., Upcott Barton, 1993
Hoskins, W.G., Devonshire Studies, 1952, re: Upcott
www.upcottroundhouse.co.uk(esp. section: "The Upcott Murder")

Historic estates in Devon